Pearl Sydenstricker Buck (June 26, 1892 – March 6, 1973) was an American writer and novelist. She is best known for The Good Earth a bestselling novel in the United States in 1931 and 1932 and won the Pulitzer Prize in 1932. In 1938, Buck won the Nobel Prize in Literature "for her rich and truly epic descriptions of peasant life in China" and for her "masterpieces", two memoir-biographies of her missionary parents. She was the first American woman to win that prize.

Buck was born in West Virginia, but in October 1892, her parents took their 4-month-old baby to China. As the daughter of missionaries and later as a missionary herself, Buck spent most of her life before 1934 in Zhenjiang, with her parents, and in Nanjing, with her first husband. She and her parents spent their summers in a villa in Kuling, Mountain Lu, Jiujiang, and it was during this annual pilgrimage that the young girl decided to become a writer. She graduated from Randolph-Macon Woman's College in Lynchburg, Virginia, then returned to China. From 1914 to 1932, after marrying John Lossing Buck, she served as a Presbyterian missionary, but she came to doubt the need for foreign missions. Her views became controversial during the Fundamentalist–Modernist controversy, leading to her resignation. After returning to the United States in 1935, she married the publisher Richard J. Walsh and continued writing prolifically. She became an activist and prominent advocate of the rights of women and racial equality, and wrote widely on Chinese and Asian cultures, becoming particularly well known for her efforts on behalf of Asian and mixed-race adoption.

Early life and education

Originally named Comfort, Pearl Sydenstricker was born in Hillsboro, West Virginia, to Caroline Maude (Stulting) (1857–1921) and Absalom Sydenstricker. Her parents, Southern Presbyterian missionaries, travelled to China soon after their marriage on July 8, 1880, but returned to the United States for Pearl's birth. When Pearl was five months old, the family arrived in China, living first in Huai'an and then in 1896 moving to Zhenjiang (then often known as Chingkiang in the Chinese postal romanization system), near the major city of Nanking. In summer, she and her family would spend time in Kuling. Her father built a stone villa in Kuling in 1897, and lived there until his death in 1931. It was during this annual summer pilgrimage in Kuling that the young girl decided to become a writer.

Of her siblings who survived into adulthood, Edgar Sydenstricker had a distinguished career with the United States Public Health Service and later the Milbank Memorial Fund, and Grace Sydenstricker Yaukey (1899–1994) wrote young adult books and books about Asia under the pen name Cornelia Spencer.

Pearl recalled in her memoir that she lived in "several worlds", one a "small, white, clean Presbyterian world of my parents", and the other the "big, loving merry not-too-clean Chinese world", and there was no communication between them. The Boxer Uprising (1899–1901) greatly affected the family; their Chinese friends deserted them, and Western visitors decreased. Her father, convinced that no Chinese could wish him harm, stayed behind as the rest of the family went to Shanghai for safety. A few years later, Pearl was enrolled in Miss Jewell's School there and was dismayed at the racist attitudes of the other students, few of whom could speak any Chinese. Both of her parents felt strongly that Chinese were their equals (they forbade the use of the word heathen), and she was raised in a bilingual environment: tutored in English by her mother, in the local dialect by her Chinese playmates, and in classical Chinese by a Chinese scholar named Mr. Kung. She also read voraciously, especially, in spite of her father's disapproval, the novels of Charles Dickens, which she later said she read through once a year for the rest of her life.

In 1911, Pearl left China to attend Randolph-Macon Woman's College in Lynchburg, Virginia, graduating Phi Beta Kappa in 1914 and a member of Kappa Delta Sorority.

Career

China
Although Buck had not intended to return to China, much less become a missionary, she quickly applied to the Presbyterian Board when her father wrote that her mother was seriously ill. In 1914, Buck returned to China. She married an agricultural economist missionary, John Lossing Buck, on May 13, 1917, and they moved to Suzhou, Anhui Province, a small town on the Huai River (not to be confused with the better-known Suzhou in Jiangsu Province). This is the region she describes in her books The Good Earth and Sons.

From 1920 to 1933, the Bucks made their home in Nanjing, on the campus of the University of Nanking, where they both had teaching positions. She taught English literature at this private, church-run university, and also at Ginling College and at the National Central University. In 1920, the Bucks had a daughter, Carol, afflicted with phenylketonuria. In 1921, Buck's mother died of a tropical disease, sprue, and shortly afterward her father moved in. In 1924, they left China for John Buck's year of sabbatical and returned to the United States for a short time, during which Pearl Buck earned her master's degree from Cornell University. In 1925, the Bucks adopted Janice (later surnamed Walsh). That autumn, they returned to China.

The tragedies and dislocations that Buck suffered in the 1920s reached a climax in March 1927, during the "Nanking Incident". In a confused battle involving elements of Chiang Kai-shek's Nationalist troops, Communist forces, and assorted warlords, several Westerners were murdered. Since her father Absalom insisted, as he had in 1900 in the face of the Boxers, the family decided to stay in Nanjing until the battle reached the city. When violence broke out, a poor Chinese family invited them to hide in their hut while the family house was looted. The family spent a day terrified and in hiding, after which they were rescued by American gunboats. They traveled to Shanghai and then sailed to Japan, where they stayed for a year, after which they moved back to Nanjing. Buck later said that this year in Japan showed her that not all Japanese were militarists. When she returned from Japan in late 1927, Buck devoted herself in earnest to the vocation of writing. Friendly relations with prominent Chinese writers of the time, such as Xu Zhimo and Lin Yutang, encouraged her to think of herself as a professional writer. She wanted to fulfill the ambitions denied to her mother, but she also needed money to support herself if she left her marriage, which had become increasingly lonely, and since the mission board could not provide it, she also needed money for Carol's specialized care. Buck traveled once more to the United States in 1929 to find long-term care for Carol, and while there, Richard J. Walsh, editor at John Day publishers in New York, accepted her novel East Wind: West Wind. She and Walsh began a relationship that would result in marriage and many years of professional teamwork.

Back in Nanking, she retreated every morning to the attic of her university house and within the year completed the manuscript for The Good Earth.  She was involved in the charity relief campaign for the victims of the 1931 China floods, writing a series of short stories describing the plight of refugees, which were broadcast on the radio in the United States and later published in her collected volume The First Wife and Other Stories.

When her husband took the family to Ithaca the next year, Buck accepted an invitation to address a luncheon of Presbyterian women at the Astor Hotel in New York City. Her talk was titled "Is There a Case for the Foreign Missionary?" and her answer was a barely qualified "no". She told her American audience that she welcomed Chinese to share her Christian faith, but argued that China did not need an institutional church dominated by missionaries who were too often ignorant of China and arrogant in their attempts to control it. When the talk was published in Harper's Magazine, the scandalized reaction led Buck to resign her position with the Presbyterian Board. In 1934, Buck left China, believing she would return, while her husband remained.

United States
The Bucks divorced in Reno, Nevada on June 11, 1935, and she married Richard Walsh that same day. He offered her advice and affection which, her biographer concludes, "helped make Pearl's prodigious activity possible". The couple lived in Pennsylvania until his death in 1960.

Following the Communist Revolution in 1949, Buck was repeatedly refused all attempts to return to her beloved China. Her 1962 novel Satan Never Sleeps described the Communist tyranny in China. During the Cultural Revolution, Buck, as a preeminent American writer of Chinese village life, was denounced as an "American cultural imperialist". Buck was "heartbroken" when she was prevented from visiting China with Richard Nixon in 1972.

Nobel Prize in Literature
In 1938 the Nobel Prize committee in awarding the prize said:

In her speech to the Academy, she took as her topic "The Chinese Novel." She explained, "I am an American by birth and by ancestry", but "my earliest knowledge of story, of how to tell and write stories, came to me in China." After an extensive discussion of classic Chinese novels, especially Romance of the Three Kingdoms, All Men Are Brothers, and Dream of the Red Chamber, she concluded that in China "the novelist did not have the task of creating art but of speaking to the people." Her own ambition, she continued, had not been trained toward "the beauty of letters or the grace of art." In China, the task of the novelist differed from the Western artist: "To farmers he must talk of their land, and to old men he must speak of peace, and to old women he must tell of their children, and to young men and women he must speak of each other." And like the Chinese novelist, she concluded, "I have been taught to want to write for these people. If they are reading their magazines by the million, then I want my stories there rather than in magazines read only by a few."

Humanitarian efforts

Buck was committed to a range of issues that were largely ignored by her generation. Many of her life experiences and political views are described in her novels, short stories, fiction, children's stories, and the biographies of her parents entitled Fighting Angel (on Absalom) and The Exile (on Carrie). She wrote on diverse subjects, including women's rights, Asian cultures, immigration, adoption, missionary work, war, the atomic bomb (Command the Morning), and violence. Long before it was considered fashionable or politically safe to do so, Buck challenged the American public by raising consciousness on topics such as racism, sex discrimination and the plight of Asian war children. Buck combined the careers of wife, mother, author, editor, international spokesperson, and political activist.

In 1949, outraged that existing adoption services considered Asian and mixed-race children unadoptable, Buck co-founded Welcome House, Inc., the first international, interracial adoption agency, along with James A. Michener, Oscar Hammerstein II and his second wife Dorothy Hammerstein. In nearly five decades of work, Welcome House has placed over five thousand children. In 1964, to support children who were not eligible for adoption, Buck established the Pearl S. Buck Foundation (name changed to Pearl S. Buck International in 1999) to "address poverty and discrimination faced by children in Asian countries." In 1964, she opened the Opportunity Center and Orphanage in South Korea, and later offices were opened in Thailand, the Philippines, and Vietnam. When establishing Opportunity House, Buck said, "The purpose ... is to publicize and eliminate injustices and prejudices suffered by children, who, because of their birth, are not permitted to enjoy the educational, social, economic and civil privileges normally accorded to children."

In 1960, after a long decline in health, her husband Richard died. She renewed a warm relation with William Ernest Hocking, who died in 1966. Buck then withdrew from many of her old friends and quarreled with others. In 1962 Buck asked the Israeli Government for clemency for Adolf Eichmann, the Nazi war criminal who was complicit in the deaths of five million Jews during WWII, as she and others believed that carrying out capital punishment against Eichmann could be seen as an act of vengeance, especially since the war had ended. In the late 1960s, Buck toured West Virginia to raise money to preserve her family farm in Hillsboro, West Virginia. Today the Pearl S. Buck Birthplace is a historic house museum and cultural center. She hoped the house would "belong to everyone who cares to go there," and serve as a "gateway to new thoughts and dreams and ways of life."  U.S. President George H. W. Bush toured the Pearl S. Buck House in October 1998. He expressed that he, like millions of other Americans, had gained an appreciation for the Chinese people through Buck's writing.

Final years
In the mid-1960s, Buck increasingly came under the influence of Theodore Harris, a former dance instructor, who became her confidant, co-author, and financial advisor. She soon depended on him for all her daily routines, and placed him in control of Welcome House and the Pearl S. Buck Foundation. Harris, who was given a lifetime salary as head of the foundation, created a scandal for Buck when he was accused of mismanaging the foundation, diverting large amounts of the foundation's funds for his friends' and his own personal expenses, and treating staff poorly. Buck defended Harris, stating that he was "very brilliant, very high strung and artistic." Before her death, Buck signed over her foreign royalties and her personal possessions to Creativity Inc., a foundation controlled by Harris, leaving her children a relatively small percentage of her estate.

Death
Pearl S. Buck died of lung cancer on March 6, 1973, in Danby, Vermont. After her death, Buck's children contested the will and accused Harris of exerting "undue influence" on Buck during her final few years. Harris failed to appear at trial and the court ruled in the family's favor.

She was interred in Green Hills Farm in Perkasie, Pennsylvania. She designed her own tombstone. Her name was not inscribed in English on her tombstone. Instead, the grave marker is inscribed with Chinese characters representing the name Pearl Sydenstricker.

Legacy 

Many contemporary reviewers were positive and praised her "beautiful prose", even though her "style is apt to degenerate into over-repetition and confusion". Robert Benchley wrote a parody of The Good Earth that emphasised these qualities. Peter Conn, in his biography of Buck, argues that despite the accolades awarded to her, Buck's contribution to literature has been mostly forgotten or deliberately ignored by America's cultural gatekeepers. Kang Liao argues that Buck played a "pioneering role in demythologizing China and the Chinese people in the American mind". Phyllis Bentley, in an overview of Buck's work published in 1935, was altogether impressed: "But we may say at least that for the interest of her chosen material, the sustained high level of her technical skill, and the frequent universality of her conceptions, Mrs. Buck is entitled to take rank as a considerable artist. To read her novels is to gain not merely knowledge of China but wisdom about life." These works aroused considerable popular sympathy for China, and helped foment a more critical view of Japan and its aggression.

Chinese-American author Anchee Min said she "broke down and sobbed" after reading The Good Earth for the first time as an adult, which she had been forbidden to read growing up in China during the Cultural Revolution. Min said Buck portrayed the Chinese peasants "with such love, affection and humanity" and it inspired Min's novel Pearl of China (2010), a fictional biography about Buck.

In 1973, Buck was inducted into the National Women's Hall of Fame. Buck was honored in 1983 with a 5¢ Great Americans series postage stamp issued by the United States Postal Service In 1999 she was designated a Women's History Month Honoree by the National Women's History Project.

Buck's former residence at Nanjing University is now the Sai Zhenzhu Memorial House along the West Wall of the university's north campus.

Pearl Buck's papers and literary manuscripts are currently housed at Pearl S. Buck International and the West Virginia & Regional History Center.

Selected bibliography

Autobiographies 
My Several Worlds: A Personal Record (New York: John Day, 1954)
My Several Worlds – abridged for younger readers by Cornelia Spencer (New York: John Day, 1957)
A Bridge for Passing (New York: John Day, 1962) – autobiographical account of the filming of Buck's children's book, The Big Wave

Biographies 

The Exile: Portrait of an American Mother (New York: John Day, 1936) – about her mother, Caroline Stulting Sydenstricker (1857–1921); serialized in Woman's Home Companion magazine (10/1935–3/1936)
Fighting Angel: Portrait of a Soul (New York: Reynal & Hitchcock, 1936) – about her father, Absalom Sydenstricker (1852–1931)
The Spirit and the Flesh (New York: John Day, 1944) – includes The Exile: Portrait of an American Mother and Fighting Angel: Portrait of a Soul

Novels 

East Wind: West Wind (New York: John Day, 1930) – working title Winds of Heaven
The Good Earth (New York: John Day, 1931); The House of Earth trilogy #1 – made into a feature film The Good Earth (MGM, 1937)
Sons (New York: John Day, 1933); The House of Earth trilogy #2; serialized in Cosmopolitan (4–11/1932)
A House Divided (New York: Reynal & Hitchcock, 1935); The House of Earth trilogy #3
The House of Earth (trilogy) (New York: Reynal & Hitchcock, 1935) – includes: The Good Earth, Sons, A House Divided
All Men Are Brothers (New York: John Day, 1933) – a translation by Buck of the Chinese classical prose epic Water Margin (Shui Hu Zhuan)
The Mother (New York: John Day, 1933) – serialized in Cosmopolitan (7/1933–1/1934) 
This Proud Heart (New York: Reynal & Hitchcock, 1938) – serialized in Good Housekeeping magazine (8/1937–2/1938)
The Patriot (New York: John Day, 1939)
Other Gods: An American Legend (New York: John Day, 1940) – excerpt serialized in Good Housekeeping magazine as "American Legend" (12/1938–5/1939)
China Sky (New York: John Day, 1941) – China trilogy #1; serialized in Collier's Weekly magazine (2–4/1941); made into a feature film China Sky (film) (RKO, 1945)
China Gold: A Novel of War-torn China (New York: John Day, 1942) – China trilogy #2; serialized in Collier's Weekly magazine (2–4/1942)
Dragon Seed (New York: John Day, 1942) – serialized in Asia (9/1941–2/1942); made into a feature film Dragon Seed (MGM, 1944)
The Promise (New York: John Day, 1943) – sequel to Dragon Seed; serialized in Asia and the Americas (Asia) (11/1942–10/1943)
China Flight (Philadelphia: Triangle Books/Blakiston Company, 19453) – China trilogy #3; serialized in Collier's Weekly magazine (2–4/1943)
Portrait of a Marriage (New York: John Day, 1945) – illustrated by Charles Hargens
The Townsman (New York: John Day, 1945) – as John Sedges
Pavilion of Women (New York: John Day, 1946) – made into a feature film Pavilion of Women (Universal Focus, 2001)
The Angry Wife (New York: John Day, 1947) – as John Sedges
Peony (New York: John Day, 1948) – published in the UK as The Bondmaid (London: T. Brun, 1949); – serialized in Cosmopolitan (3–4/1948)
Kinfolk (New York: John Day, 1949) – serialized in Ladies' Home Journal (10/1948–2/1949)
The Long Love (New York: John Day, 1949) – as John Sedges
God's Men (New York: John Day, 1951)
Sylvia (1951) – alternate title No Time for Love, serialized in Redbook magazine (1951)
Bright Procession (New York: John Day, 1952) – as John Sedges
The Hidden Flower (New York: John Day, 1952) – serialized in Woman's Home Companion magazine (3–4/1952)
Come, My Beloved (New York: John Day, 1953)
Voices in the House (New York: John Day, 1953) – as John Sedges
Imperial Woman The Story of the Last Empress of China (New York: John Day, 1956) – about Empress Dowager Cixi; serialized in Woman's Home Companion (3–4/1956)
Letter from Peking (New York: John Day, 1957)
American Triptych: Three John Sedges Novels (New York: John Day, 1958) – includes The Townsman, The Long Love, Voices in the House
Command the Morning (New York: John Day, 1959)
Satan Never Sleeps (New York: Pocket Books, 1962) – 1962 film Satan Never Sleeps, also known as The Devil Never Sleeps and Flight from Terror
The Living Reed A Novel of Korea (New York: John Day, 1963)
Death in the Castle (New York: John Day, 1965)
The Time Is Noon (New York: John Day, 1966)
The New Year (New York: John Day, 1968)
The Three Daughters of Madame Liang (London: Methuen, 1969)
Mandala: A Novel of India (New York: John Day, 1970)
The Goddess Abides (New York: John Day, 1972)
All under Heaven (New York: John Day, 1973)
The Rainbow (New York: John Day, 1974)
The Eternal Wonder (believed to have been written shortly before her death, published in October 2013)

Non-fiction 
Is There a Case for Foreign Missions? (New York: John Day, 1932)
The Chinese Novel: Nobel Lecture Delivered before the Swedish Academy at Stockholm, December 12, 1938 (New York: John Day, 1939)
Of Men and Women (New York: John Day, 1941) – Essays
American Unity and Asia (New York: John Day, 1942) – UK edition titled Asia and Democracy, London: Macmillan, 1943) – Essays
What America Means to Me (New York: John Day, 1943) – UK edition (London: Methuen, 1944) – Essays
Talk about Russia (with Masha Scott) (New York: John Day, 1945) – serialized in Asia and the Americas magazine (Asia) as Talks with Masha (1945)
Tell the People: Talks with James Yen about the Mass Education Movement (New York: John Day, 1945)
How It Happens: Talk about the German People, 1914–1933, with Erna von Pustau (New York: John Day, 1947)
American Argument with Eslanda Goode Robeson (New York: John Day, 1949)
The Child Who Never Grew (New York: John Day, 1950)
The Man Who Changed China: The Story of Sun Yat-sen (New York: John Day, 1953) – for children
Friend to Friend: A Candid Exchange between Pearl S. Buck and Carlos P. Romulo (New York: John Day, 1958)
For Spacious Skies (1966)
The People of Japan (1966)
To My Daughters, with Love (New York: John Day, 1967)
The Kennedy Women (1970)
China as I See It (1970)
The Story Bible (1971)
Pearl S. Buck's Oriental Cookbook (1972)
Words of Love (1974)

Short stories

Collections 
The First Wife and Other Stories (London: Methuen, 1933) – includes: "The First Wife", "The Old Mother", "The Frill", "The Quarrell", "Repatriated", "The Rainy Day", Wang Lung", "The Communist", "Father Andrea", "The New Road", "Barren Spring", *"The Refugees", "Fathers and Mothers", "The Good River"
Today and Forever: Stories of China (New York: John Day, 1941) – includes: "The Lesson", The Angel", "Mr. Binney's Afternoon", "The Dance", "Shanghai Scene", "Hearts Come Home", "His Own Country", "Tiger! Tiger!", "Golden flower", "The Face of Buddha", "Guerrilla Mother", "A Man's Foes", "The Old Demon"
Twenty-seven Stories (Garden City, NY: Sun Dial Press, 1943) – includes (from The First Wife and Other Stories): "The First Wife", "The Old Mother", "The Frill", "The Quarrell", "Repatriated", "The Rainy Day", Wang Lung", "The Communist", "Father Andrea", "The New Road", "Barren Spring", *"The Refugees", "Fathers and Mothers", "The Good River"; and (from Today and Forever: Stories of China): "The Lesson", The Angel", "Mr. Binney's Afternoon", "The Dance", "Shanghai Scene", "Hearts Come Home", "His Own Country", "Tiger! Tiger!", "Golden flower", "The Face of Buddha", "Guerrilla Mother", "A Man's Foes", "The Old Demon"
Far and Near: Stories of Japan, China, and America (New York: John Day, 1947) – includes: "The Enemy", "Home Girl", "Mr. Right". The Tax Collector", "A Few People", "Home to Heaven", Enough for a Lifetime", Mother and Sons", Mrs. Mercer and Her Self", The Perfect Wife", "Virgin birth", "The Truce", "Heat Wave", "The One Woman"
Fourteen Stories (New York: John Day, 1961) – includes: "A Certain Star," "The Beauty", "Enchantment", "With a Delicate Air", "Beyond Language", "Parable of Plain People", "The Commander and the Commissar", "Begin to Live", "The Engagement", "Melissa", "Gift of Laughter", "Death and the Dawn", "The Silver Butterfly", "Francesca"
Hearts Come Home and Other Stories (New York: Pocket Books, 1962)
Stories of China (1964)
Escape at Midnight and Other Stories (1964)
East and West Stories (1975)
Secrets of the Heart: Stories (1976)
The Lovers and Other Stories (1977)
Mrs. Stoner and the Sea and Other Stories (1978)
The Woman Who Was Changed and Other Stories (1979)
Beauty Shop Series: "Revenge in a Beauty Shop" (1939) – original title "The Perfect Hairdresser"
Beauty Shop Series: "Gold Mine" (1940)
Beauty Shop Series: "Mrs. Whittaker's Secret"/"The Blonde Brunette" (1940)
Beauty Shop Series: "Procession of Song" (1940)
Beauty Shop Series: "Snake at the Picnic" (1940) – published as "Seed of Sin" (1941)
Beauty Shop Series: "Seed of Sin" (1941) – published as "Snake at the Picnic (1940)

Individual short stories 
Unknown title (1902) – first published story, pen name "Novice", Shanghai Mercury
"The Real Santa Claus" (c. 1911)
"Village by the Sea" (1911)
"By the Hand of a Child" (1912)
"The Hours of Worship" (1914)
"When 'Lof' Comes" (1914)
"The Clutch of the Ancients" (1924)
"The Rainy Day" (c. 1925)
"A Chinese Woman Speaks" (1926)
"Lao Wang, the Farmer" (1926)
"The Solitary Priest" (1926)
"The Revolutionist" (1928) – later published as "Wang Lung" (1933)
"The Wandering Little God" (1928)
"Father Andrea" (1929)
"The New Road" (1930)
"Singing to her Death" (1930)
"The Barren Spring" (1931)
"The First Wife" (1931)
"The Old Chinese Nurse" (1932)
"The Quarrel" (1932)
"The Communist" (1933)
"Fathers and Mothers" (1933)
"The Frill" (1933)
"Hidden is the Golden Dragon" (1933)
"The Lesson" (1933) – later published as "No Other Gods" (1936; original title used in short story collections)
"The Old Mother" (1933)
"The Refugees" (1933)
"Repatriated" (1933)
"The Return" (1933)
"The River" (1933) – later published as "The Good River" (1939)
"The Two Women" (1933)
"The Beautiful Ladies" (1934) – later published as "Mr. Binney's Afternoon" (1935)
"Fool's Sacrifice" (1934)
"Shanghai Scene" (1934)
"Wedding and Funeral" (1934)
"Between These Two" (1935)
"The Dance" (1935)
"Enough for a Lifetime" (1935)
"Hearts Come Home" (1935)
"Heat Wave" (1935)
"His Own Country" (1935)
"The Perfect Wife" (1935)
"Vignette of Love" (1935) – later published as "Next Saturday and Forever" (1977)
"The Crusade" (1936)
"Strangers Are Kind" (1936)
"The Truce" (1936)
"What the Heart Must" (1937) – later published as "Someone to Remember" (1947)
"The Angel" (1937)
"Faithfully" (1937)
"Ko-Sen, the Sacrificed" (1937)
"Now and Forever" (1937) – serialized in Woman's Home Companion magazine (10/1936–3/1937)
"The Woman Who Was Changed" (1937) – serialized in Redbook magazine (7–9/1937)
"The Pearls of O-lan" – from The Good Earth (1938)
"Ransom" (1938)
"Tiger! Tiger!" (1938)
"Wonderful Woman" (1938) – serialized in Redbook magazine (6–8/1938)
"For a Thing Done" (1939) – originally titled "While You Are Here"
"The Old Demon" (1939) – reprinted in Great Modern Short Stories: An Anthology of Twelve Famous Stories and Novelettes, selected, and with a foreword and biographical notes by Bennett Cerf (New York: The Modern library, 1942)
"The Face of Gold" (1940, in Saturday Evening Post) – later published as "The Face of Buddha" (1941)
"Golden Flower" (1940)
"Iron" (1940) – later published as "A Man's Foes" (1940)
"The Old Signs Fail" (1940)
"Stay as You Are" (1940) – serialized in Cosmopolitan (3–7/1940)
"There Was No Peace" (1940) – later published as "Guerrilla Mother" (1941)
"Answer to Life" (novella; 1941)
"More Than a Woman" (1941) – originally titled "Deny It if You Can"
"Our Daily Bread" (1941) – originally titled "A Man's Daily Bread, 1–3", serialized in Redbook magazine (2–4/1941), longer version published as Portrait of a Marriage (1945)
The Enemy (1942, Harper's Magazine) – staged by the Indian "Aamra Kajon" (Drama Society), on the Bengal Theatre Festival 2019
"John-John Chinaman" (1942) – original title "John Chinaman"
"The Long Way 'Round" – serialized in Cosmopolitan (9/1942–2/1943)
"Mrs. Barclay's Christmas Present" (1942) – later published as "Gift of Laughter" (1943)
"Descent into China" (1944)
"Journey for Life" (1944) – originally titled "Spark of Life"
"The Real Thing" (1944) – serialized in Cosmopolitan (2–6/1944); originally intendeds as a serial "Harmony Hill" (1938)
"Begin to Live" (1945)
"Mother and Sons" (1945)
"A Time to Love" (1945) – later published under its original title "The Courtyards of Peace" (1969)
"Big Tooth Yang" (1946) – later published as "The Tax Collector" (1947)
"The Conqueror's Girl" (1946) – later published as "Home Girl" (1947)
"Faithfully Yours" (1947)
"Home to Heaven" (1947)
"Incident at Wang's Corner" (1947) – later published as "A Few People" (1947)
"Mr. Right" (1947)
"Mrs. Mercer and Her Self" (1947)
"The One Woman" (1947)
"Virgin Birth" (1947)
"Francesca" (Good Housekeeping magazine, 1948)
"The Ember" (1949)
"The Tryst" (1950)
"Love and the Morning Calm" – serialized in Redbook magazine (1–4/1951)
"The Man Called Dead" (1952)
"Death and the Spring" (1953)
"Moon over Manhattan" (1953)
"The Three Daughters" (1953)
"The Unwritten Rules" (1953)
"The Couple Who Lived on the Moon" (1953) – later published as "The Engagement" (1961)
"A Husband for Lili" (1953) – later published as "The Good Deed (1969)
"The Heart's Beginning" (1954)
"The Shield of Love" (1954)
"Christmas Day in the Morning" (1955) – later published as "The Gift That Lasts a Lifetime"
"Death and the Dawn" (1956)
"Mariko" (1956)
"A Certain Star" (1957)
"Honeymoon Blues" (1957)
"China Story" (1958)
"Leading Lady" (1958) – alternately titled "Open the Door, Lady"
"The Secret" (1958)
"With a Delicate Air" (1959)
"The Bomb (Dr. Arthur Compton)" (1959)
"Heart of a Man" (1959)
"Melissa" (1960)
"The Silver Butterfly" (1960)
"The Beauty" (1961)
"Beyond Language" (1961)
"The Commander and the Commissar" (1961)
"Enchantment" (1961)
"Parable of Plain People" (1961)
"A Field of Rice" (1962)
"A Grandmother's Christmas" (1962) – later published as "This Day to Treasure" (1972)
""Never Trust the Moonlight" (1962) – later published as "The Green Sari" (1962)
"The Cockfight, 1963
"A Court of Love" (1963)
"Escape at Midnight" (1963)
"The Lighted Window" (1963)
"Night Nurse" (1963)
"The Sacred Skull" (1963)
"The Trap" (1963)
"India, My India" (1964)
"Ranjit and the Tiger" (1964)
"A Certain Wisdom" (1967, in Woman's Day magazine)
"Stranger Come Home" (1967)
"The House They Built" (1968, in Boys' Life magazine)
"The Orphan in My Home" (1968)
"Secrets of the Heart" (1968)
"All the Days of Love and Courage" 1969) – later published as "The Christmas Child" (1972)
"Dagger in the Dark" (1969)
"Duet in Asia" (1969; written 1953
"Going Home" (1969)
"Letter Home" (1969; written 1943)
"Sunrise at Juhu" (1969)
"Two in Love" (1970) – later published as "The Strawberry Vase" (1976)
"The Gifts of Joy" (1971)
"Once upon a Christmas" (1971)
"The Christmas Secret" (1972)
"Christmas Story" (1972)
"In Loving Memory" (1972) – later published as "Mrs. Stoner and the Sea" (1976)
"The New Christmas" (1972)
"The Miracle Child" (1973)
"Mrs. Barton Declines" (1973) – later published as "Mrs. Barton's Decline" and "Mrs. Barton's Resurrection" (1976)
"Darling Let Me Stay" (1975) – excerpt from "Once upon a Christmas" (1971)
"Dream Child" (1975)
"The Golden Bowl" (1975; written 1942)
"Letter from India" (1975)
"To Whom a Child is Born" (1975)
"Alive again" (1976)
"Come Home My Son" (1976)
"Here and Now" (1976; written 1941)
"Morning in the Park" (1976; written 1948)
"Search for a Star" (1976)
"To Thine Own Self" (1976)
"The Woman in the Waves" (1976; written 1953)
"The Kiss" (1977)
"The Lovers" (1977)
"Miranda" (1977)
"The Castle" (1979; written 1949)
"A Pleasant Evening" (1979; written 1948)
Christmas Miniature (New York: John Day, 1957) – in UK as Christmas Mouse (London: Methuen, 1959) – illustrated by Anna Marie Magagna
Christmas Ghost (New York: John Day, 1960) – illustrated by Anna Marie Magagna

Unpublished stories
"The Good Rich Man" (1937, unsold)
"The Sheriff" (1937, unsold)
"High and Mighty" (1938, unsold)
"Mrs. Witler's Husband" (1938, unsold)
"Mother and Daughter" (1938, unsold; alternate title "My Beloved")
"Mother without Child" (1940, unsold)
"Instead of Diamonds" (1953, unsold)

Unpublished stories, undated
"The Assignation" (submitted not sold)
"The Big Dance" (unsold)
"The Bleeding Heart" (unsold)
"The Bullfrog" (unsold)
"The Day at Dawn" (unpublished)
"The Director"
"Heart of the Jungle (submitted, unsold)
"Images" (sold but unpublished)
"Lesson in Biology" / "Useless Wife" (unsold)
"Morning in Okinawa" (unsold)
"Mrs. Jones of Jerrell Street" (unsold)
"One of Our People" (sold, unpublished)
"Summer Fruit" (unsold)
"Three Nights with Love" (submitted, unsold) – original title "More Than a Woman"
"Too Many Flowers" (unsold)
"Wang the Ancient" (unpublished)
"Wang the White Boy" (unpublished)

Stories: Date unknown
"Church Woman"
"Crucifixion"
"Dear Son"
"Escape Me Never" – alternate title of "For a Thing Done"
"The Great Soul"
"Her Father's Wife"
"Horse Face"
"Lennie"
"The Magic Dragon"
"Mrs. Jones of Jerrell Street" (unsold)
"Night of the Dance"
"One and Two"
"Pleasant Vampire"
"Rhoda and Mike"
"The Royal Family"
"The Searcher"
"Steam and Snow"
"Tinder and the Flame"
"The War Chest"
"To Work the Sleeping Land"

Children's books and stories 
The Young Revolutionist (New York: John Day, 1932) – for children
Stories for Little Children (New York: John Day, 1940) – pictures by Weda Yap
"When Fun Begins" (1941)
The Chinese Children Next Door (New York: John Day, 1942)
The Water Buffalo Children (New York: John Day, 1943) – drawings by William Arthur Smith
Dragon Fish (New York: John Day, 1944) – illustrated by Esther Brock Bird
Yu Lan: Flying Boy of China (New York: John Day, 1945) – drawings by Georg T. Hartmann
The Big Wave (New York: John Day, 1948) – illustrated with prints by Hiroshige and Hokusai – for children
One Bright Day (New York: John Day, 1950) – published in the UK as One Bright Day and Other Stories for Children (1952)
The Beech Tree (New York: John Day, 1954) – illustrated by Kurt Werth – for children
"Johnny Jack and His Beginnings" (New York: John Day, 1954)
Christmas Miniature (1957) – published in the UK as The Christmas Mouse (1958)
"The Christmas Ghost" (1960)
"Welcome Child (1964)
"The Big Fight" (1965)
"The Little Fox in the Middle" (1966)
Matthew, Mark, Luke and John (New York: John Day, 1967) – set in South Korea
"The Chinese Storyteller" (1971)
"A Gift for the Children" (1973)
"Mrs Starling's Problem" (1973)

Awards 
Pulitzer Prize for the Novel: The Good Earth (1932)
William Dean Howells Medal (1935)
Nobel Prize in Literature (1938)
Child Study Association of America's Children's Book Award (now Bank Street Children's Book Committee's Josette Frank Award): The Big Wave (1948)

Museums and historic houses 

Several historic sites work to preserve and display artifacts from Pearl's profoundly multicultural life:
 The Pearl S. Buck Summer Villa, in Kuling town, Mountain Lu, Jiujiang, China
 Pearl S. Buck House in Nanjing University, China 
 The Zhenjiang Pearl S. Buck Research Association and former residence in Zhenjiang, China 
 Pearl S. Buck Birthplace in Hillsboro, West Virginia
 Green Hills Farm in Bucks County, Pennsylvania
 The Pearl S. Buck Memorial Hall, Bucheon City, South Korea

See also 
Christian feminism
List of female Nobel laureates

Notes

Further reading 

 
 Harris, Theodore F. (in consultation with Pearl S. Buck), Pearl S. Buck: a Biography (John Day, 1969. )
 Theodore F. Harris (in consultation with Pearl S. Buck), Pearl S. Buck; a biography. Volume two: Her philosophy as expressed in her letters (John Day, 1971. )
 .
 Hunt, Michael H. "Pearl Buck-Popular Expert on China, 1931-1949." Modern China 3.1 (1977): 33-64.
 Jean So, Richard. "Fictions of Natural Democracy: Pearl Buck, The Good Earth, and the Asian American Subject." Representations 112.1 (2010): 87-111.
 Kang, Liao. Pearl S. Buck: A Cultural Bridge across the Pacific. (Westport, CT, London: Greenwood, Contributions to the Study of World Literature 77, 1997). .
 Leong. Karen J. The China Mystique: Pearl S. Buck, Anna May Wong, Mayling Soong, and the Transformation of American Orientalism (Berkeley: University of California Press, 2005). 
 Lipscomb, Elizabeth Johnston, Frances E. Webb and Peter J. Conn, eds., The Several Worlds of Pearl S. Buck: Essays Presented at a Centennial Symposium, Randolph-Macon Woman's College, March 26–28, 1992. Westport, CT: Greenwood Press, Contributions in Women's Studies, 1994. 
 
 Shaffer, Robert. "Women and international relations: Pearl S. Buck's critique of the Cold War." Journal of Women's History 11.3 (1999): 151-175.
 Spurling, Hilary. Burying the Bones: Pearl Buck in China (London: Profile, 2010) 
 Stirling, Nora B. Pearl Buck, a Woman in Conflict (Piscataway, NJ: New Century Publishers, 1983).
 Suh, Chris. ""America's Gunpowder Women" Pearl S. Buck and the Struggle for American Feminism, 1937–1941." Pacific Historical Review 88.2 (2019): 175-207. online
 {{citation|title= Het China-gevoel van Pearl S. Buck (The China-feeling of Pearl S. Buck |publisher = Uitgeverij Brandt |year= 2021|first= Bettine |last= Vriesekoop|author-link= Bettine Vriesekoop}}.
 Wacker, Grant. "Pearl S. Buck and the Waning of the Missionary Impulse" Church history 72.4 (2003): 852-874.
 Xi Lian. The Conversion of Missionaries: Liberalism in American Protestant Missions in China, 1907–1932. (University Park: Pennsylvania State University Press, 1997). 
 Mari Yoshihara. Embracing the East: White Women and American Orientalism. (New York: Oxford University Press, 2003). 

 External links 

 Pearl S. Buck fuller bibliography at WorldCat
 The Pearl S. Buck Birthplace in Pocahontas County West Virginia
 Pearl S. Buck International
 The Zhenjiang Pearl S. Buck Research Association, China (in Chinese & English)
 
List of Works
 University of Pennsylvania website dedicated to Pearl S. Buck
 
 
 
 National Trust for Historic Preservation on the Pearl S. Buck House Restoration
 Pearl Buck  interviewed by Mike Wallace on The Mike Wallace Interview'' February 8, 1958
 
 
 The Pearl S. Buck Literary Manuscripts and Other Collections at the West Virginia & Regional History Collection, WVU Libraries
 FBI Records: The Vault – Pearl Buck at fbi.gov
 Spring, Kelly. "Pearl Buck". National Women's History Museum.
 Presentation by Peter Conn on Pearl S. Buck: A Cultural Biography, March 5, 1997, C-SPAN
 A House Divided Manuscript at Dartmouth College Library

1892 births
1973 deaths
20th-century American novelists
20th-century American women writers
Activists from West Virginia
American autobiographers
American expatriates in China
American historical novelists
American human rights activists
Women human rights activists
American Nobel laureates
American Presbyterian missionaries
Female Christian missionaries
American women non-fiction writers
American women novelists
Children of American missionaries in China
Christian novelists
Christian humanists
Cornell University alumni
Members of the Society of Woman Geographers
Academic staff of Nanjing University
Nobel laureates in Literature
Novelists from Pennsylvania
Novelists from West Virginia
People from Bucks County, Pennsylvania
People from Hillsboro, West Virginia
Presbyterian Church in the United States members
Presbyterian missionaries in China
Presbyterians from West Virginia
Pulitzer Prize for the Novel winners
Randolph College alumni
Women autobiographers
Women historical novelists
Women Nobel laureates
Writers from Philadelphia
Writers from Zhenjiang
American anti-communists
Members of the American Academy of Arts and Letters